Phialophora cinerescens is an ascomycete fungus that is a plant pathogen infecting carnations.

References

External links 
 Index Fungorum
 USDA ARS Fungal Database
 EPPO Global Database

Fungal plant pathogens and diseases
Ornamental plant pathogens and diseases
Eurotiomycetes